Korpana is a City (City council) and a tehsil in Rajura subdivision of Chandrapur district in Nagpur revenue Division in the Vidarbha region in the state of Maharashtra, India.
This is Last Tehsil Place In Chandrapur District. The telanaga border and Yavatmal district .Also this taluka is leading in cement production in Maharashtra. It has 4 big cement factories in the country and 1 coal mine.The taluka covers a total of 113 villages.

References

Cities and towns in Chandrapur district
Talukas in Maharashtra